Lieveren is a village in the Netherlands and is part of the Noordenveld municipality in Drenthe.

It was first mentioned in 1480 as Tho Liveren. The etymology is unclear. Most of the river has been canalised, however it still meanders through the landscape near Lieveren. In 1840, Lieveren was home to 93 people. The local pub is the only monument of the village.

Gallery

References 

Populated places in Drenthe
Noordenveld